Yohannes Abraham is an American government official who is the Representative to the Association of Southeast Asian Nations. He previously served as Deputy Assistant to the President, Chief of Staff, and Executive Secretary of the United States National Security Council.

Early life and education
Abraham graduated from Thomas Jefferson High School for Science and Technology in Fairfax County, Virginia. He received a B.A. in political science from Yale College in 2007 and an MBA from Harvard Business School, where he graduated with high distinction as a Baker Scholar in 2019. While in business school, Abraham was also selected as a residential fellow at the Harvard Institute of Politics.

Career
Abraham was formerly part of the Biden-Harris transition, where he oversaw many of the day-to-day operations. During the Obama-Biden administration, Abraham served as both deputy assistant to the president and Senior Advisor to the National Economic Council. He served as Chief of Staff for the Office of Public Engagement and Intergovernmental Affairs. Abraham also worked with Vanguard Group’s global investment unit, as well as serving on the faculty of the Harvard Kennedy School of Government.

Ambassador to Association of Southeast Asian Nations 
 
On May 13, 2022, President Joe Biden announced his intent to nominate Abraham to be the representative to the Association of Southeast Asian Nations. Hearings on his nomination were held before the Senate Foreign Relations Committee on July 13, 2022. The committee favorably reported his nomination to the Senate floor on August 3, 2022. Abraham was confirmed on August 4, 2022 via voice vote. He presented his credentials to the Secretary-General of ASEAN Lim Jock Hoi on October 5, 2022.

Personal life
Abraham is a native of Springfield, Virginia.

References

Yale College alumni
Harvard Business School alumni
Obama administration personnel
Biden administration personnel
Living people
Year of birth missing (living people)
Ambassadors of the United States to ASEAN
Thomas Jefferson High School for Science and Technology alumni